This is a list of major bioinformatics institutions.
 National Center for Biotechnology Information (NCBI)
 European Bioinformatics Institute (EMBL-EBI)
 Australia Bioinformatics Resource  (EMBL-ABR)
 Swiss Institute of Bioinformatics (SIB)
 Scripps Research Institute (TSRI)
 European Molecular Biology Laboratory (EMBL)
 Wellcome Trust Sanger Institute (WTSI)
 Computational Biology Department
 Broad Institute
 Whitehead Institute
 The Institute for Genomic Research
 Center for Biomolecular Science and Engineering
 Netherlands Bioinformatics Centre
 COSBI
 Institute of Bioinformatics (IOB)
 Max Planck Institute for Molecular Cell Biology and Genetics (MPI-CBG)
 Partner Institute for Computational Biology
 Flatiron Institute
 DDBJ Center (DDBJ)
 Database Center for Life Science (DBCLS)

Bioinformatics organizations
Bioinformatics institutions
Bioinformatics